Jéssica Miroslava Eterovic Pozas is Chilean beauty queen who was crowned Miss World Chile 1993 and represented her country at the Miss World 1993 pageant in Sun City, South Africa where she was unplaced.

She is married to television producer Eduardo Dominguez.

Jessica Miroslava is of Croat origin.

References
History of Miss World Chile, 1988-2006 

Living people
Chilean people of Croatian descent
Miss World Chile winners
Miss World 1993 delegates
Year of birth missing (living people)